Guanshan Township is an urban township in northern Taitung County, Taiwan.

History

Formerly called Lilong, which is from the Amis word meaning "red worms" and rendered in Hokkien as A-lí-lóng (阿里壟). By 1920, the town was called Kanzan Town under Kanzan District, Taitō Prefecture.

Geography
It is located in the Huatung Valley South segment. Beinan River flows through. In the east it is bordered by the Hai'an Range and in the west by the Central Mountain Range. Guanshan has a Tropical Monsoon Climate. Annual rainfall is 2,000 mm with an average temperature of 23.7 degrees Celsius.

Covering an area of 58.735 km2, Guanshan has a population of 8,160 people (as of February 2023).

Administrative divisions
Guanshan Township consists of 7 villages, namely Chungfu, Fengchuan, Hsinfu, Lilong, Tekao, Tienkuan and Yuemei, and 135 neighborhoods.

Economy
Rice is the most important crop in the township due to its relatively flat terrain suitable for paddy field.

Tourist attractions

 Guanshan Bike Trail
 Guanshan Hongshi Trail
 Guanshan Waterfront Park
 Guanshan Tianho Temple
 Nanshan Temple
 Old Guanshan Rail Station

Transportation

Guanshan Township is accessible from Guanshan Station and Haiduan Station of the Taiwan Railways.

Notable natives
 Donna Chiu, singer
 Kong Jaw-sheng, Chairperson of Financial Supervisory Commission (2004-2006)
 Lo Hsien-che, spy
 Tseng Li-cheng, taekwondo athlete

References

External links

 Guanshan Township Office, Taitung County 

Townships in Taitung County